Fatih Şahin (born 20 April 1979) is a Turkish politician, lawyer, and General Secretary of the Justice and Development Party, serving since 20 July 2017.

Personal life 
He is fluent in English and Arabic. He is married and has two children.

References 

1979 births
Living people
21st-century Turkish politicians
Justice and Development Party (Turkey) politicians